The NS 8500 was a series of tank engines with the C (0-6-0) wheel layout of the Dutch Railways (NS) and its predecessor Maatschappij tot Exploitatie van Staatsspoorwegen (SS). They were manufactured by Hohenzollern and Henschel & Sohn.

History 
The construction of these locomotives was related to the fact that increasingly heavier passenger trains on the connecting line Amsterdam W.P. to Amsterdam C.S. had to be run. The shunting locomotives used earlier were too light for this. That is why this locomotive was built with relatively large driving wheels, with a diameter of 1,400 mm (4 ft 71/8 in). Furthermore, the wheelbase, that is the distance from centre to centre of the driving wheels, was relatively large, resulting in locomotives that had a very smooth running. Even at the maximum permitted speed of 60 km/h (37.2 mph).

They weren't really typical shunting locomotives either; The wheels were too large for this, but special coupler of train sets and thus these machines shuttled between the various Amsterdam stations.

Withdrawal and scrapping 
Six locomotives were withdrawn from service in 1947 due to war damage. Locomotive 8515 was withdrawn from service in 1948 and locomotive 8510 was withdrawn from service in 1950.

In 1951 two more 8500s were withdrawn from service. The last five locomotives numbers: 8505, 8506, 8509, 8512 and 8514 were sold in 1952 to Ferrocarril de Langreo, the only standard gauge line in Spain. There, the locomotives were somewhat converted and served for a few years on a mining railway from Gijon to Langreo in Asturias, after which they were scrapped.

Gallery

Sources and references 

 

 

Rolling stock of the Netherlands
Hohenzollern locomotives
Henschel locomotives
Steam locomotives of the Netherlands
Maatschappij tot Exploitatie van Staatsspoorwegen